The 2001–02 Czech Extraliga season was the ninth season of the Czech Extraliga since its creation after the breakup of Czechoslovakia and the Czechoslovak First Ice Hockey League in 1993.

Standings

Playoffs

Quarterfinal
 HC Sparta Praha - HC Oceláři Třinec 5:1 (1:0,3:0,1:1)
 HC Sparta Praha - HC Oceláři Třinec 6:4 (4:1,1:2,1:1)
 HC Oceláři Třinec - HC Sparta Praha 2:4 (0:1,1:0,1:3)
 HC Oceláři Třinec - HC Sparta Praha 4:3 SN (1:1,2:2,0:0,0:0)
 HC Sparta Praha - HC Oceláři Třinec 3:7 (0:3,3:3,0:1)
 HC Oceláři Třinec - HC Sparta Praha 1:4 (1:0,0:0,0:4)
 HC IPB Pojišťovna Pardubice - HC Slavia Praha 2:4 (2:1,0:0,0:3)
 HC IPB Pojišťovna Pardubice - HC Slavia Praha 4:1 (2:0,1:1,1:0)
 HC Slavia Praha - HC IPB Pojišťovna Pardubice 3:2 SN (1:0,0:1,1:1,0:0)
 HC Slavia Praha - HC IPB Pojišťovna Pardubice 1:0 (1:0,0:0,0:0)
 HC IPB Pojišťovna Pardubice - HC Slavia Praha 5:2 (1:0,4:2,0:0)
 HC Slavia Praha - HC IPB Pojišťovna Pardubice 3:1 (0:0,1:0,2:1)
 HC Continental Zlín - HC Excalibur Znojemští Orli 3:1 (1:0,1:1,1:0)
 HC Continental Zlín - HC Excalibur Znojemští Orli 1:2 (0:0,0:1,1:1)
 HC Excalibur Znojemští Orli - HC Continental Zlín 6:4 (4:1,0:1,2:2)
 HC Excalibur Znojemští Orli - HC Continental Zlín 5:3 (1:0,1:3,3:0)
 HC Continental Zlín - HC Excalibur Znojemští Orli 6:2 (3:0,1:1,2:1)
 HC Excalibur Znojemští Orli - HC Continental Zlín 2:5 (0:1,0:2,2:2)
 HC Continental Zlín - HC Excalibur Znojemští Orli 4:3 PP (2:2,1:1,0:0,1:0)
 HC Keramika Plzeň - HC Vítkovice 2:1 (0:0,0:1,2:0)
 HC Keramika Plzeň - HC Vítkovice 1:4 (1:1,0:2,0:1)
 HC Vítkovice - HC Keramika Plzeň 2:3 (1:0,1:3,0:0)
 HC Vítkovice - HC Keramika Plzeň 9:1 (3:0,4:0,2:1)
 HC Keramika Plzeň - HC Vítkovice 2:5 (0:1,2:2,0:2)
 HC Vítkovice - HC Keramika Plzeň 4:2 (1:1,1:0,2:1)

Semifinal
 HC Sparta Praha - HC Slavia Praha 4:1 (1:0,0:1,3:0)
 HC Slavia Praha - HC Sparta Praha 1:2 (1:1,0:0,0:1)
 HC Sparta Praha - HC Slavia Praha 5:1 (4:0,1:0,0:1)
 HC Continental Zlín - HC Vítkovice 4:1 (2:0,1:0,1:1)
 HC Vítkovice - HC Continental Zlín 5:1 (4:1,1:0,0:0)
 HC Continental Zlín - HC Vítkovice 1:2 (1:0,0:0,0:2)
 HC Vítkovice - HC Continental Zlín 5:2 (0:0,3:0,2:2)

Final
HC Sparta Praha - HC Vitkovice 2–3, 3–2, 7–0, 4-1

HC Sparta Praha is the Czech champion for 2001–02.

Relegation

 HC Vagnerplast Kladno - HC Bílí Tygři Liberec 1:4  
 HC Vagnerplast Kladno - HC Bílí Tygři Liberec 1:4 (0:2,1:0,0:2)
 HC Vagnerplast Kladno - HC Bílí Tygři Liberec 2:5 (0:2,1:1,1:2)
 HC Bílí Tygři Liberec - HC Vagnerplast Kladno 2:4 (1:0,0:2,1:2)
 HC Bílí Tygři Liberec - HC Vagnerplast Kladno 3:0 (1:0,1:0,1:0)
 HC Vagnerplast Kladno - HC Bílí Tygři Liberec 1:2 (0:0,1:1,0:1)

References

External links 
 

Czech Extraliga seasons
1
Czech